Felipe Souza Ferreyra (born 21 May 1998) is a Brazilian professional footballer who plays as a forward.

Career statistics

Club

References

1998 births
Living people
Brazilian footballers
Brazilian expatriate footballers
Association football forwards
Clube Atlético Mineiro players
Cruzeiro Esporte Clube players
Curicó Unido footballers
OFI Crete F.C. players
Chilean Primera División players
Super League Greece players
Brazilian expatriate sportspeople in Chile
Expatriate footballers in Chile
Brazilian expatriate sportspeople in Greece
Expatriate footballers in Greece